Samdrup R. Wangchuk is a Bhutanese politician who has been a member of the National Assembly of Bhutan, since October 2018.

Education
He holds a Bachelor of Dental Surgery (BDS) degree and a Master in Orthodontics from Khonkaen University, Thailand.

Political career
Before joining politics, he worked as a first and only Orthodontist at JDWNRH.

He was elected to the National Assembly of Bhutan as a candidate of DPT from Kanglung Samkhar Udzorong constituency in 2018 Bhutanese National Assembly election. He received 3866 votes and defeated Tenzin Namgay, a candidate of DNT.

References 

1965 births
Living people
Bhutanese MNAs 2018–2023
Druk Phuensum Tshogpa politicians
Bhutanese dentists
Druk Phuensum Tshogpa MNAs
Orthodontists